Events from the year 1967 in North Korea.

Incumbents
Premier: Kim Il-sung 
Supreme Leader: Kim Il-sung

Events
Kapsan Faction Incident
1967 North Korean parliamentary election

Births

 14 September - Ri Myung-hun

See also
Years in Japan
Years in South Korea

References

Further reading

 
North Korea
1960s in North Korea
Years of the 20th century in North Korea
North Korea